Eduard Grosu (born 5 January 1980) is a Moldovan footballer who currently plays for FC Dacia Chișinău.

References

 

1980 births
Living people
Moldovan footballers
Moldova international footballers
FC Zhenis Astana players
Moldovan expatriate footballers
Expatriate footballers in Kazakhstan
Expatriate footballers in Russia
Moldovan expatriate sportspeople in Kazakhstan
FC Sfîntul Gheorghe players
Association football midfielders
FC Yenisey Krasnoyarsk players
FC Novokuznetsk players